Cape Verde competed at the 2014 Summer Youth Olympics, in Nanjing, China from 16 August to 28 August 2014.

Athletics

Cape Verde qualified one athlete.

Qualification Legend: Q=Final A (medal); qB=Final B (non-medal); qC=Final C (non-medal); qD=Final D (non-medal); qE=Final E (non-medal)

Girls
Track & road events

Football

Cape Verde are scheduled to compete in the boys' tournament.

Boys' Tournament

Roster

 Amilton Borges Silveira Mendonca
 Jose Luis Brito Fortes
 Ricardo da Luz Fortes
 Kelvin Delgado Medina
 Wilson Fernandes Teixeira
 Antonio Ferreira Vaz
 Jason Goncalves Rocha
 Joao Lopes Miranda
 Andradino Moniz Garcia
 Edgar Moreno Mendes
 Kenny Nascimento Gomes
 Dennis Oliveira Ribeiro
 Mario Pasquinha Evora
 Fabio Ramos de Brito
 Paulo Rebelo Figueiredo Soares
 Erick Silva Goncalves
 Tiago Vaz Fonseca
 Adilson Vaz Semedo

Group Stage

Knockout Stage

Taekwondo

Cape Verde was given a wild card to compete.

Girls

References

2014 in Cape Verdean sport
Nations at the 2014 Summer Youth Olympics
Cape Verde at the Youth Olympics